The Football Association of Singapore (FAS) is the governing body responsible for the administration of football in Singapore. Established in 1892 as the Singapore Football Association (SFA), it is the oldest football association in all of Asia. The FAS is also one of the founding members of both the Asian Football Confederation (AFC) and the ASEAN Football Federation (AFF). It has been affiliated with FIFA since 1952.

The FAS oversees the organisation and development of football and advancing the game at all levels in Singapore, and is responsible for all aspects of the amateur and professional game in its territory. This includes its flagship domestic league, the Singapore Premier League (SPL), as well as the men's, women's and youth national football teams. The FAS is headquartered at the Jalan Besar Stadium, located at Kallang.

The FAS also manages the organisation and running of league and cup competitions, the stewardship of international teams, the establishment of youth development, women's football, refereeing and coaching frameworks.

History
The association was also previously known as the Singapore Amateur Football Association (abbreviation: SAFA) on 14 May 1929 before adopting its current name on 13 January 1966.

Singapore national team

The Singapore national football team, administered by FAS, is one of the most successful sides in ASEAN Football Championship history, winning the regional international tournament four times in 1998, 2004/5, 2007 and 2012. Despite the country having a relatively small population pool, it has generally punched above its weight by successively producing squads that has fiercely competed with its larger and much more populated neighbours.

Singapore has also achieved notable results beyond their sub-confederation. In the 2007 AFC Asian Cup qualification, Singapore became the only team to beat Iraq where Iraq were en route to their Asian Cup winning campaign. Singapore also drew with China 0–0 and 1–1 at home in 2006 and 2009 respectively. In March 2008, Australia also failed to beat Singapore when the game ended in a goalless draw. During the 2018 FIFA World Cup qualifiers, Japan was held to a draw at home at the Saitama Stadium by Singapore, being the only game where Japan had dropped points in the group.

Youth Development Programmes
The FAS focuses on football development and operates national age group programmes with U-15, U-16, U-17, U-18 and U-23 teams (known as Young Lions, who compete in the country's professional Singapore Premier League).

All Singapore Premier League clubs have also fully implemented their own programmes for the Under-14s, adding on to the existing U-16s and U-18s program.

Former presidents

 Soh Ghee Soon: 1957–1963
 Hussein Kumari: 1963–1965
 Abu Bakar Pawanchee: 1965–1967
 Tay Soo Yong: 1967–1968
 Woon Wah Siang: 1968
 Lenny Rodrigo: 1968–1971
 NSPB / SSC: 1971–1974
 R.B.I. Pates: 1974–1976
 N. Ganesan: 1976–1982
 Teo Chong Tee: 1982–1988
 Abbas Abu Amin: 1988–1991
 Hsu Tse-Kwang: 1991–1994
 Ibrahim Othman: 1994–1999
 Mah Bow Tan: 1999–2004
 Ho Peng Kee: 2004–2009
 Zainudin Nordin: 2009–2016
 Lim Kia Tong: 2017–2022
 Bernard Tan: 2022-present(Interim)

Council members

FAS Tournaments
 Singapore Premier League
 FAS National Football League (2 Divisions)
 FAS Island Wide League
 FAS Women's Premier League
 FAS Women's National League

FAS Affiliates 2017

Singapore Premier League Clubs
 Albirex Niigata (S)
 Balestier Khalsa
 Geylang International
 Home United
 Hougang United
 Tampines Rovers
 Warriors FC
 Gombak United (sit-out club)
 Tanjong Pagar United (sit-out club)

FAS National Football League Clubs
 Academy Junior Football
 Admiralty CSC
 Admiralty FC
 Balestier United RC
 Bishan Barx
 Eunos Crescent
 GFA Sporting Westlake
 GFA Victoria
 Gymkhana FC
 Jungfrau Punggol
 Kaki Bukit SC
 Katong FC
 Kembangan United
 Police Sports Association
 SAFSA
 Siglap FC
 Singapore Cricket Club
 Singapore Khalsa Association
 South Avenue SC
 Starlight Soccerities
 Tiong Bahru FC
 Yishun Sentek Mariners
 Warwick Knights FC

Singapore M-League/M-Cup Team (The Lions)

Former national players
Notable Former National Players – Singapore National Football Team

Eric Paine (1968–1978)
Fandi Ahmad (1978–1982, 1993–1999)
Au-Yeong Pak Kuan (1979-1985, 1988–1989)
Kadir Yahya (1993–1999)
Lim Tong Hai (1992–1994)
David Lee (1978–1994)
Zulkarnaen Zainal (1994)
Mohd Rafi Ali (1993–94)
Nazri Nasir (1988–1994)
Malek Awab (1980–1987, 1993–1994)
K. Kannan (1980–1988, 1992)
Razali Saad (1988–1994)
Jefri Rahmat (1988–1994)
D. Tokijan (1985–1991)
Borhan Abu Samah (1985–1991, 1993–1994)
Syed Faruk (1988–1994)
Steven Tan (1993–1994)
Lee Man Hon (1994)
V Selvaraj (1994)
Terry Pathmanathan (1978–1992)
Abdul Malek (1980–1993)
Hasnim Haron
Zulkifli Kartoyoho
Azhar Yusope
Quah Brothers
Dollah Kassim
V. Sundramoorthy
Aide Iskandar
Yahya Madon (1984–1994)

Corporate structure
The FAS council was first appointed by the government in 1968, and has been controlled continually by government appointees for more than three decades from the 1980s to 2015. From 2004 to 2015, its president had been an elected member of the ruling People's Action Party, and was appointed by the Minister for Sports.

In 2015, FIFA requested an end to political appointments of the national body's council members. FAS therefore changed its constitution in 2016 and held general elections for its council members starting from 2017. In response, the FAS also stated that "We have always been in consultation with FIFA over the last 30 years. They are aware of the uniqueness of our situation, and have always given us special dispensation."

Investments
During the Annual General Meeting (AGM) in September 2016, it was revealed that organising expenses on grassroots competitions like the National Football League (NFL), Island Wide League (IWL) and FA Cup amounted to about $70,000 during the previous financial year from April 2015 to March 2016. This figure which represented a mere 0.2 per cent of the FAS' total annual budget of S$35.8 million sparked disapproval within the local football community with many perceiving it as FAS's lack of regard for grassroots football.

In a press conference on 13 October 2016, FAS vice-president Bernard Tan clarified that the amount did not include prize money and participation fees contributed by the teams counted under the domestic league account.

Funding
In early April 2017, Bill Ng, chairman of SPL club Hougang United and NFL club Tiong Bahru Football Club (TBFC), claimed that he had donated S$850,000 to the FAS with the intention of helping Singapore football, but that the money had gone to the ASEAN Football Federation (AFF) instead. The allegations came in the prelude to the first open election of the FAS council.

FAS secretary Winston Lee responded that Ng was aware of where the funds were used, that $200,000 went to the former LionsXII, while $500,000 was used to support the AFF's Football Management System. Lee said that it was former FAS president Zainudin Nordin who asked Ng to donate to the AFF, while Ng disputed the claim. FAS responded with a statement that Ng's allegations of financial impropriety within FAS to damage the credibility of the association was regrettable, and it was unusual that Ng had chosen to hide Zainudin's role in the transaction.

On 20 April 2017, the Singapore Police Force (SPF) raided the FAS headquarters over alleged financial misuse of funds filed by Sport Singapore (formerly known as the Singapore Sports Council). Zainudin Nordin, Winston Lee, Bill Ng and his wife Bonnie Wong, were all arrested before being subsequently released on bail. The four assisted with the Commercial Affairs Department (CAD) with the probe into the alleged misuse of funds and obstruction of club audits of TBFC. In September 2021, the CAD in accordance with the Attorney-General announced that they had concluded their investigations and that the individuals involved will not face charges.

See also
Singapore national football team
Singapore Premier League
Singapore Cup
Singapore League Cup
Singapore Community Shield
Kallang Roar the Movie

Notes

References

External links
 
 Singapore at AFC site
 Singapore at FIFA website

Singapore
Football in Singapore
1892 establishments in Singapore
1952 establishments in Singapore
Sports governing bodies in Singapore
Sports organizations established in 1892